Reyaad Pieterse (born 17 February 1992) is a South African professional soccer player who plays as a goalkeeper for Premier Soccer League side Mamelodi Sundowns. He was capped seven times for the South Africa national soccer team.

Club career

Shamrock Rovers
Reyaad played for Bidvest Wits in his native South Africa and was spotted by Shamrock Rovers while playing for the Nike Football Academy in Loughborough. He signed for Stephen Kenny at Rovers in April 2012 and made his senior debut for the Hoops against SD Galway in the League of Ireland Cup on 9 April. A week later he made his home debut at Tallaght Stadium against Derry City in the Setanta Sports Cup. However he was sent off in this semi final clash.

Reyaad made his league debut for Shamrock at Sligo Rovers on 12 May, but that would be his only league appearance of the season as he was kept on the bench by Oscar Jansson. In September he won the Leinster Senior Cup.

He left the Hoops at the end of the 2012 League of Ireland season.

Kaizer Chiefs
In January 2013, Pieterse returned to South Africa to sign for Kaizer Chiefs. He made his debut on 27 November 2013 in a 4-1 win over Polokwane City after coming in for Itumeleng Khune who collected a hamstring niggle. Pieterse had to be substituted during Chiefs’ 2-0 win over AS Vita on 29 March as Chiefs were knocked out of the CAF Champions League after a 3-2 aggregate defeat when Pieterse sustained an injury to his eye after colliding with the post. A statement from their medical team on the club's official website said, "Reyaad had a laceration to his left eyelid after a collision with the upright. It had to be stitched field side, no fracture was found on Reyaad, we have to wait for the swelling to subside so that he can open his eye again,"

Honours
 Shamrock Rovers
Leinster Senior Cup – 2012

 Kaizer Chiefs
Premier Soccer League – 12/13,14/15
Nedbank Cup – 2012–13 Nedbank Cup
MTN 8 - 2014 MTN 8

 SuperSport United F.C.
 Nedbank Cup - 2016–17 Nedbank Cup
 MTN 8 - 2017 MTN 8

 Mamelodi Sundowns F.C.
 Premier Soccer League - 18/19,19/20,20/21,21/22
 Nedbank Cup - 2019–20 Nedbank Cup,2021–22 Nedbank Cup
Telkom Knockout - 2019 Telkom Knockout
 MTN 8 - 2021 MTN 8

References

1992 births
Living people
South African soccer players
Association football goalkeepers
Soccer players from Johannesburg
Cape Coloureds
Shamrock Rovers F.C. players
Kaizer Chiefs F.C. players
SuperSport United F.C. players
Mamelodi Sundowns F.C. players
South African Premier Division players
League of Ireland players
Expatriate association footballers in the Republic of Ireland
Nike Academy players